Group E of the 2019 FIFA Women's World Cup took place from 10 to 20 June 2019. The group consisted of Cameroon, Canada, the Netherlands and New Zealand. The top two teams, the Netherlands and Canada, along with the third-placed team, Cameroon (as one of the four best third-placed teams), advanced to the round of 16.

Teams

Notes

Standings

In the round of 16:
 The winners of Group E, the Netherlands, advanced to play the runners-up of Group D, Japan.
 The runners-up of Group E, Canada, advanced to play the runners-up of Group F, Sweden.
 The third-placed team of Group E, Cameroon, advanced to play the winners of Group D, England (as one of the four best third-placed teams).

Matches
All times listed are local, CEST (UTC+2).

Canada vs Cameroon

New Zealand vs Netherlands

Netherlands vs Cameroon

Canada vs New Zealand

Netherlands vs Canada

Cameroon vs New Zealand

Discipline
Fair play points would have been used as tiebreakers in the group if the overall and head-to-head records of teams were tied, or if teams had the same record in the ranking of third-placed teams. These were calculated based on yellow and red cards received in all group matches as follows:
first yellow card: minus 1 point;
indirect red card (second yellow card): minus 3 points;
direct red card: minus 4 points;
yellow card and direct red card: minus 5 points;

Only one of the above deductions were applied to a player in a single match.

References

External links
 
 2019 FIFA Women's World Cup Group E, FIFA.com

2019 FIFA Women's World Cup
Canada at the 2019 FIFA Women's World Cup
Cameroon at the 2019 FIFA Women's World Cup
New Zealand at the 2019 FIFA Women's World Cup
Netherlands at the 2019 FIFA Women's World Cup